Torna Club Békéscsaba is a gymnastics facility in Békéscsaba, Hungary.

The head coaches are Juliet and Michael Unyatinszki.

History 

Békéscsaba has produced many Olympians and National Champions.

Notable gymnasts & alumni 

 Henrietta Ónodi - 1992 Olympic Vault Champion, 1992 World Vault Champion
 Adrienn Varga - 1995 Hungarian Team Member
 Adrienne Nyeste - 2000 Olympian
 Angela Strifler - 2011 European Hungarian Team Member
 Renáta Kiss - 2002 and 2003 World Hungarian Team Member
 Enikő Korcsmáros - 2008 European Team Member, 2007 European Vault Finalist 
 Dorina Böczögő - 2008 and 2012 Olympian
 Noémi Makra - 2013 European All-around Finalist

References
 http://www.bcs-gym.hu/

External links
 

Gymnastics organizations
Gymnastics in Hungary
Gymnastics clubs
Békéscsaba